Mohammed Yahya Jahfali (born on October 24, 1990) is a Saudi Arabian professional footballer who plays as a defender for Al Hilal of the Saudi Premier League. He was called up to the Saudi Arabia national football team for 2018 FIFA World Cup qualification.

Club career
Jahfali is best known for scoring a last minute equalizing goal against Al-Nassr FC in the 2015 King Cup final match which led them to the penalty shootouts that ended up a victory for his side.

International career
In May 2018 he was named in Saudi Arabia’s preliminary squad for the 2018 World Cup in Russia.

Career statistics

Club

Honours
Al-Hilal
Saudi Professional League: 2016–17, 2017–18, 2019–20, 2020–21, 2021–22
King Cup: 2015, 2017, 2019–20
Crown Prince Cup: 2015–16
Saudi Super Cup: 2015, 2018, 2021
AFC Champions League: 2019, 2021

References

External links
 
 Saudi League Profile

Saudi Arabian footballers
Saudi Arabia international footballers
Association football defenders
Al-Faisaly FC players
Al Hilal SFC players
1990 births
Living people
Sportspeople from Riyadh
Saudi Professional League players